The Eparchy of Zvornik and Tuzla is an eparchy of the Serbian Orthodox Church with its seat in Bijeljina, Bosnia and Herzegovina. It has jurisdiction over the north-eastern regions of Bosnia and Herzegovina. Since 2017, Bishop of Zvornik and Tuzla is Fotije Sladojević.

History
In the north-eastern parts of Bosnia and Herzegovina, on the territory of the present day Eparchy of Zvornik and Tuzla, there are several archeological localities that indicate the presence of early Christianity in that region during late Roman period and early Middle Ages. Since 1284, the region came under the rule of Serbian king Stefan Dragutin and soon after that an Eastern Orthodox Bishop Vasilije was appointed for all Bosnian regions, western of the river Drina. During the reign of Serbian Despots Stefan Lazarević (1389-1427) and Đurađ Branković (1427-1456), much of the north-eastern Bosnia was again under Serbian rule. During that time, the foundation was laid for the establishment of an Eastern Orthodox Eparchy in that region, under the jurisdiction of the Serbian Patriarchate of Peć.

By the end of 15th century much of the region was conquered by Ottoman Turks who organized the territory into a province called the Sanjak of Zvornik. Between 1526 and 1541, during the attempt of Metropolitan Pavle of Smederevo to restore the Serbian Patriarchate of Peć, Eparchy of Zvornik and its bishop Teofan were also included in local ecclesiastical disputes with Archbishopric of Ohrid. Finally in 1557, Serbian Patriarchate of Peć was restored and the Eparchy of Zvornik was returned to its jurisdiction, with bishops of Zvornik holding the honorary title of metropolitan.

In 1766, when Serbian Patriarchate of Peć was abolished, the Eparchy of Zvornik and all other Serbian eparchies under Ottoman rule came under the jurisdiction of Ecumenical Patriarchate of Constantinople. Bishop of Zvornik kept his honorary title of Metropolitan, as was also the custom in the Ecumenical Patriarchate. By the end of 18th century and during much of 19th century, bishops of this Eparchy resided in the city of Tuzla. Since 1878, territory of Bosnia and Herzegovina was under the occupation of Austria-Hungary, but under the Church Convention of 1880 all Eastern Orthodox eparchies remained under supreme ecclesiastical jurisdiction of Ecumenical Patriarchate of Constantinople. At the end of the First World War in 1918, all Serbian Orthodox bishops in Bosnia and Herzegovina reached a unanimous decision to join with other Serbian ecclesiastical provinces into united Serbian Orthodox Church. The process of unification was completed in 1920 and since then Eparchy of Zvornik and Tuzla remains part of the united Serbian Orthodox Church.

Heads
This is an incomplete list of bishops and metropolitans of Zvornik.

Monasteries
Ozren Monastery
Papraća Monastery
Lovnica Monastery

See also
Eastern Orthodoxy in Bosnia and Herzegovina
Serbs of Bosnia and Herzegovina
List of the Eparchies of the Serbian Orthodox Church

References

Bibliography

External links

 Serbian Orthodox Church

Religious sees of the Serbian Orthodox Church
Serbian Orthodox Church in Bosnia and Herzegovina
Religion in Republika Srpska
Dioceses established in the 15th century